Graeme Stapleton (born 1 February 1946) is a former international speedway rider from New Zealand.

Speedway career 
Stapleton competed in motocross in New Zealand in the 1960s before deciding to focus on speedway. From mid 1967 to 1969 he lived in England and rode in motocross events in the UK and Europe. After returning to New Zealand he won the New Zealand 250cc motocross championship. In November 1970 he began riding speedway at the Templeton track in Christchurch.    The following year he went to England and rode for the Canterbury Crusaders in the British League Division Two.  He also made six appearances for the Wimbledon Dons in 1971 and was a member of the team for the next three years. In 1975 and 1976 he did not ride in the British League because he was in New Zealand helping his business partner Ronnie Moore after he had a serious accident.   Stapleton resumed riding in for Wimbledon in 1977 and 1978, and for the Newcastle Diamonds in 1978 and 1979.  He also had two matches for the Hull Vikings in 1979.

Stapleton reached the final of the Speedway World Pairs Championship in the 1973 Speedway World Pairs Championship, and represented New Zealand in other team events from 1972 to 1976.

World Final appearances

World Pairs Championship
 1973 -  Borås (with Ivan Mauger) - 7th - 10pts

References 

1946 births
New Zealand speedway riders
Canterbury Crusaders riders
Hull Vikings riders
Newcastle Diamonds riders
Wimbledon Dons riders
Sportspeople from Christchurch
Living people